Raducz  is a village in the administrative district of Gmina Nowy Kawęczyn, within Skierniewice County, Łódź Voivodeship, in central Poland. It was probably founded in the 18th century.

In 2004 the village had a population of 30.

References

Raducz